Peter Haber is a paralympic athlete from Germany competing mainly in category T37 sprint events.

Biography
Haber has competed in three Paralympics, winning at least one medal at each.  His first games were in 1992 where he won three track golds in 100m, 200m and 400m and a silver in the long jump as well as being part of the German 4 × 100 m relay team.  In 1996 he won three more silvers in the 10om, 200m and long jump.  This was followed in 2000 where he won a silver in the 100m and missed out in the relay and 200m.

References

Paralympic athletes of Germany
Athletes (track and field) at the 1992 Summer Paralympics
Athletes (track and field) at the 1996 Summer Paralympics
Athletes (track and field) at the 2000 Summer Paralympics
Paralympic gold medalists for Germany
Paralympic silver medalists for Germany
Living people
Medalists at the 1992 Summer Paralympics
Medalists at the 1996 Summer Paralympics
Medalists at the 2000 Summer Paralympics
Year of birth missing (living people)
Paralympic medalists in athletics (track and field)
German male sprinters
German male long jumpers
20th-century German people